Dunbar High School can refer to:
 Former Dunbar High School (Bessemer, Alabama) in Bessemer, Alabama
 Dunbar High School (Little Rock, Arkansas) in Little Rock, Arkansas
 Dunbar High School (Chicago, Illinois) in Chicago, Illinois
 Dunbar High School (Dayton, Ohio) in Dayton, Ohio
 Dunbar High School (Fort Myers, Florida) in Fort Myers, Florida
 Dunbar High School (Livingston, Texas) in Livingston, Texas
 Dunbar High School (Washington, D.C.) in Washington, D.C.

See also
Dunbar School (disambiguation)
Paul Lawrence Dunbar School (disambiguation)